Stefan Mihajlović ( born 1 February 1999) is a Serbian footballer who plays as a winger for FK Rad.

References

External links
 

Living people
1999 births
Serbian footballers
Serbian expatriate footballers
Serbia youth international footballers
Association football wingers
Liga FPD players
Red Star Belgrade footballers
FK Voždovac players
FK Mladost Lučani players
OFK Žarkovo players
FC Blau-Weiß Linz players
FK Mačva Šabac players
FK Proleter Novi Sad players
FK Rad players
People from Gjilan
Serbian expatriate sportspeople in Austria
Expatriate footballers in Austria